Westlake is an unincorporated community on Siltcoos Lake in Lane County, Oregon, United States, approximately seven miles south of Florence.  Its area is included in the city limits of the incorporated city of Dunes City. The post office in Dunes City is named "Westlake", and most addresses in Dunes City have a Florence mailing address and are not in the area historically associated with Westlake.

Further reading
Benchmark Oregon: Road & Recreation Atlas - Third Edition

Neighborhoods in Oregon
Unincorporated communities in Lane County, Oregon
Unincorporated communities in Oregon